Suphisellus flavolineatus is a species of burrowing water beetle in the subfamily Noterinae. It was described by Régimbart in 1889 and is found in Argentina and Brazil.

References

Suphisellus
Beetles described in 1889